Aglaia sexipetala is a species of plant in the family Meliaceae. It is found in Indonesia, Malaysia, Papua New Guinea, Singapore, Thailand, and possibly the Philippines.

References

sexipetala
Near threatened plants
Taxonomy articles created by Polbot